Judith R. Shapiro (born January 24, 1942) is a former President of Barnard College, a liberal arts college for women at Columbia University; as President of Barnard, she was also an academic dean within the university.  She was also a professor of anthropology at Barnard.  Shapiro became Barnard's 6th president in 1994 after a teaching career at Bryn Mawr College where she was chair of the Department of Anthropology.  After serving as Acting Dean of the Undergraduate College in 1985-6, she was Provost, the chief academic officer, from 1986 until 1994. Debora L. Spar was appointed to replace Shapiro, effective July 1, 2008.

Education and career
A native of New York City, Shapiro was the first Barnard president educated in the New York public schools. Her mother taught Latin and was a librarian in the school system. Judith Shapiro is a magna cum laude graduate of Brandeis University in Massachusetts. She received her Ph.D. in anthropology from Columbia University in New York. She began her teaching career at the University of Chicago in 1970, the first woman appointed to the Department of Anthropology, and moved to Bryn Mawr in 1975.

She has written many scholarly articles on gender differentiation, social theory and missionization, based on her field research in lowland South America, notably among the Tapirapé and Yanomami Indians of Brazil, and in the North American Great Basin. She was President of the American Ethnological Society, a Fellow at the Center for Advanced Study in the Behavioral Sciences, and a Fellow of the American Council of Learned Societies. In December 2002, she received the National Institute of Social Sciences’ Gold Medal Award for her contributions as a leader in higher education for women. She was elected in 2003 to membership in the prestigious American Philosophical Society, joining 728 distinguished members nationally in the oldest learned society in the United States.

Since 2013, she has served as president of the Teagle Foundation in New York City, which works to support and strengthen liberal arts education and serve as a catalyst for the improvement of teaching and learning.

References

External links
  Columbia University Record article on Shapiro, 3/25/1994

Living people
1942 births
Presidents of Barnard College
American anthropologists
Brandeis University alumni
Columbia University alumni
University of Chicago faculty
Bryn Mawr College faculty
Members of the American Philosophical Society
Jewish anthropologists